Catalino Ortiz Brocka (April 3, 1939 – May 22, 1991) was a Filipino film director. He is widely regarded as one of the most influential and significant filmmakers in the history of Philippine cinema. He co-founded the organization Concerned Artists of the Philippines (CAP), dedicated to helping artists address issues confronting the country, and the Free the Artist Movement. He was a member of the  Coalition for the Restoration of Democracy. 

He directed landmark films such as Tinimbang Ka Ngunit Kulang (1974), Maynila sa mga Kuko ng Liwanag (1975), Insiang (1976), Bayan Ko: Kapit sa Patalim (1984), and Orapronobis (1989). After his death in a car accident in 1991, he was posthumously given the National Artist of the Philippines for Film award for "having made significant contributions to the development of Philippine arts."  In 2018,  Brocka was identified by the Human Rights Victims' Claims Board as a Motu Proprio human rights violations victim of the Martial Law Era.

Early life 
Brocka was born in Pilar, Sorsogon. He grew up and lived in San Jose, Nueva Ecija and graduated from Nueva Ecija High School in 1956.

Career 
He directed his first film, Wanted: Perfect Mother, based on The Sound of Music and a local comic serial, in 1970. It won an award for best screenplay at the 1970 Manila Film Festival. Later that year he also won the Citizen's Council for Mass Media's best-director award for the film Santiago!

In 1974, Brocka directed Tinimbang Ka Ngunit Kulang ("You Have Been Weighed and Found Wanting"), which told the story of a teenager growing up in a small town amid its petty and gross injustices. It was a box-office success, and earned Brocka another Best Director award, this time from the Filipino Academy of Movie Arts and Sciences (FAMAS).

The following year, he directed Maynila sa mga Kuko ng Liwanag ("Manila in the Claws of Light"), which is considered by many critics, including British film critic and historian Derek Malcolm, to be the greatest Philippine film ever made. The film tells the allegorical tale of a young provincial named Julio Madiaga who goes to Manila looking for his lost love, Ligaya Paraiso. The episodic plot has him careering from one adventure to another until he finally finds Ligaya. Much of the film's acclaim is directed towards the excellent cinematography by Mike de Leon, who would later on direct landmark films such as Kisapmata and Batch '81. The film won the FAMAS Awards for Best Picture, Best Director, Best Actor, and Best Supporting Actor in 1976.

Insiang (1976) was the first Philippine film ever shown at the Cannes Film Festival. It was screened in the Directors' Fortnight section of the 1978 Cannes Film Festival. It is considered to be one of Brocka's best films — some say his masterpiece. The film centers on a young woman named Insiang who lives in the infamous Manila slum area, Tondo. It is a Shakespearean tragedy that deals with Insiang's rape by her mother's lover, and her subsequent revenge.

The film Jaguar (1979) was nominated for the Palme d'Or at the 1980 Cannes Film Festival, becoming the first Filipino film to compete in the main competition of the festival. It won Best Picture and Best Director at the 1980 FAMAS Awards. It also won five Gawad Urian Awards, including Best Picture and Best Direction.

In 1981, Brocka returned to the Cannes' Director's Fortnight with his third entry, Bona, a film about obsession.

In 1983, Brocka created the organization Concerned Artists of the Philippines (CAP), which he led for two years. His stand was that artists were first and foremost citizens and, as such, must address the issues confronting the country. His group became active in anti-government rallies after the assassination of Benigno Aquino Jr., eventually becoming one of the progressive organizations representing artists and cultural workers in the country. On January 28, 1985, Brocka and fellow filmmaker Behn Cervantes were arrested at a nationwide transport strike organized by public transportation drivers. They were charged for organizing illegal assembly and denied bail. Both directors denied being leaders of the strike, stating they were attending in sympathy with the drivers. They were released after 16 days, following public pressure for President Ferdinand Marcos to release the directors. He joined the Coalition for the Restoration of Democracy after his release.

In 1984, Bayan Ko ("My Country") was deemed subversive by the government of Ferdinand Marcos, and underwent a legal battle to be shown in its uncut form. At the 1984 Cannes Film Festival however, it was nominated for the Palme d'Or. It garnered four honors at the 1986 Gawad Urian Awards, including Best Picture.

In 1986, Brocka served as a jury member in the 39th Cannes Film Festival.

Brocka directed over forty films. Macho Dancer (1988) was screened in the Philippines at the time of its release, but it was heavily censored due to its political and sexual content. Brocka secretly smuggled an uncensored 35mm print of the film out of the country to evade government censorship; the print is now in the collection of the Museum of Modern Art. Other notable works include Orapronobis (international title: Fight for Us) (1989) and Gumapang Ka sa Lusak (1990).

For his opposition against the Marcos regime, Brocka, in 1986, was appointed by President Corazon Aquino as a member of the 1986 Constitutional Commission to draft a new constitution for the country. He eventually resigned in August 1986. His main contribution to the 1987 Constitution is Article III, Section 4. According to Justice Adolfo Azcuna, he was the only delegate who had succeeded in amending the Bill of Rights.

One of the last things Brocka campaigned for was the removal of U.S. bases in the Philippines. He would continue to do so, urging senators and the government to remove U.S. military presence in the country, until his death.

Brocka was openly gay, and a convert to Mormonism.

Death 
On May 22, 1991, Brocka and actor William Lorenzo left the Spindle Music Lounge, where they watched a show starring Malu Barry, in a 1991 Toyota Corolla being driven by Lorenzo, heading home to Tandang Sora in Quezon City, Metro Manila. At around 1:30 a.m., the car crashed into an electric pole made of concrete along East Avenue, after Lorenzo tried to avoid a tricycle suddenly swerving towards their path. Both Brocka and Lorenzo were rushed to the East Avenue Medical Center, where Brocka was declared dead on arrival, with Lorenzo in critical condition but declared out of danger by doctors. In 1997, Brocka was given the posthumous distinction of National Artist for Film. 

== Legacy ==
Lino Brocka's name has been included on Bantayog ng mga Bayani's Wall of Remembrance, which recognizes heroes and martyrs who fought against martial law in the Philippines under Ferdinand E. Marcos. 

Brocka was also recognized by the University of the Philippines (U.P.), his alma mater, for his involvement in the fight against martial law in the Philippines. At the recognition ceremonies held at U.P., then university president Emerlinda Roman lamented how the "dictatorship had crushed [U.P. students' and alumni's] dreams for the future." Roman said the recognition was held to "remember their extraordinary valor." Former Senator Jovito Salonga also noted the sacrifices made by the honorees. In his address to the audience, Salonga said, "We promise their relatives that we will never forget their sacrifices so that the light of justice may never be extinguished in this country whose fertile soil was washed by their blood."

The Development Council of the Philippines organized a retrospective of Brocka's films on September 20–25, 2016, "in remembrance of the proclamation of Martial Law 44 years ago."  Screenings of Brocka's films and of the documentary Signed: Lino Brocka were held at Cinemateque Manila. A symposium, a panel discussion with martial law survivors, and a film editing workshop were also held as part of the retrospective.

Contestable Nation-Space Cinema, Cultural Politics, and Transnationalism in the Marcos-Brocka Philippines, a book by University of the Philippines Professor Rolando B. Tolentino, focuses on Brocka's engagement with society and dictatorship in the Philippines. The book explores "Brocka's filmic engagement and critique of the Marcos politics provide the condition of possibility that allows for the dictatorship to cohere and fragment, and for 1970s and 1980s Philippine cinema to be an important receptacle and symptom of negotiations with the dictatorship, the latter allowing for the foregrounding of subversions to the state and its order."

The Cultural Center of the Philippines commemorated Brocka's 70th birth anniversary in 2009 with "Remembering Brocka: Realities/Rarities," a series of screenings of Brocka's films and public fora following the screenings.

In 1987, a documentary entitled Signed: Lino Brocka was directed by Christian Blackwood. It won the 1988 Peace Film Award at the Berlin International Film Festival.

The Philippine Educational Theater Association, where Brocka was once executive director, named its multi-purpose hall the Lino Brocka Hall, in memory of the director.

Law professor Tony La Viña noted the significance of the 1990 Philippine Supreme Court decision in the Brocka vs. Enrile case, which, for La Viña, "illustrates... what a difference democracy makes." Brocka, Behn Cervantes, and Howie Severino were arrested by officers from the Northern Police District at a protest rally in 1985 while Ferdinand Marcos was still president. Brocka, Cervantes, and Severino were subsequently charged with illegal assembly and inciting to sedition. In a decision issued after the EDSA People Power Revolution that ousted Marcos, the Supreme Court ruled that the criminal proceedings against Brocka et al. amounted to persecution and were "undertaken by state officials in bad faith."

Filmography

As director and writer

Awards
Brocka was awarded the Ramon Magsaysay Award for Journalism, Literature and Creative Communication Arts in 1985, for "making cinema a vital social commentary, awakening public consciousness to disturbing realities of life among the Filipino poor". He was posthumously named Philippine National Artist for Film in 1997.

Further reading
 
 Lino Brocka: Legendary Filmmaker, First LDS Convert in the Philippines (About Brocka's conversion to Mormonism)
 Mission Impossible 1: Filmmaking in the Philippines 1896-1986 (historical overview)
 Guardian Unlimited (UK) feature on Derek Malcolm's Century of Films, which includes Brocka's "Manila: In The Claws of Darkness"
 Lino Brocka: the artist and his times, ed. by Mario A. Hernando, Manila : Cultural Center of the Philippines, 1993.
 Who are we to judge the insane? - "Tinimbang ka ngunit Kulang"
 "Director Lino Brocka: Stronger than Life"

References

External links
 

1939 births
1991 deaths
People from Nueva Ecija
Filipino film directors
LGBT film directors
LGBT Latter Day Saints
Filipino gay men
National Artists of the Philippines
Filipino Latter Day Saints
Road incident deaths in the Philippines
Marcos martial law victims
Individuals honored at the Bantayog ng mga Bayani
History of the Philippines (1965–1986)
Martial law under Ferdinand Marcos
Political repression in the Philippines
Presidency of Ferdinand Marcos
Converts to Mormonism
Artists and cultural workers honored at the Bantayog ng mga Bayani
Members of the Philippine Constitutional Commission of 1986